Six Black Horses is a 1962 American Western film directed by Harry Keller and starring Audie Murphy, Dan Duryea and Joan O'Brien.

Plot
Ben Lane (Audie Murphy) is breaking a horse in the desert that he believes to be stray. He is caught by some ranchers who treat him as a horse thief when he is saved by Frank Jesse (Dan Duryea). Lane and Jesse are hired by Kelly (Joan O'Brien), who offers to pay them $1,000 each to take her to a town to be with her husband. In reality, she is setting up Jesse because he killed her husband in a shootout. A unique part of the film is that Lane rescues  a collie dog that goes with him everywhere, including riding the pack horse.

Cast
 Audie Murphy as Ben Lane
 Dan Duryea as Frank Jesse
 Joan O'Brien as Kelly
George Wallace as Will Boone
 Roy Barcroft as Mustanger
 Bob Steele as Puncher
 Henry Wills as Indian leader
 Phil Chambers as Undertaker
 Charlita as Mexican dancer (as Charlita Regis)
 Dale Van Sickel as Man

Production
Universal hired Burt Kennedy to write an original film script. Kennedy said he wrote it with Richard Widmark in mind.

Parts of the film were shot at Snow Canyon and Leeds in Utah.

Comic book adaption
 Dell Movie Classic: Six Black Horses (January 1963)

See also
 List of American films of 1962

References

External links
 
 
 

1962 Western (genre) films
1962 films
American Western (genre) films
Audie Murphy
Films directed by Harry Keller
Films adapted into comics
Films shot in Utah
1960s English-language films
1960s American films